1:1 pixel mapping is a video display technique applicable to devices with native fixed pixels, such as LCD monitors and plasma displays. A monitor that has been set to 1:1 pixel mapping will display an input source without scaling it, such that each pixel received is mapped to a single native pixel on the monitor. This technique avoids loss of sharpness due to scaling artifacts and normally avoids incorrect aspect ratio due to stretching. If the input resolution is less than the monitor's native resolution, this will result in black borders around the image (e.g. letterboxing or windowboxing).


See also
Overscan
HD ready 1080p

Notes

References

Digital imaging